Malpaso Productions is Clint Eastwood's production company. It was established in 1967 as The Malpaso Company by Eastwood's financial adviser Irving Leonard for the film Hang 'Em High, using profits from the Dollars Trilogy. Leonard served as President of the Malpaso Company until his death on December 13, 1969.

Name origins

The name is derived from Malpaso Creek (Spanish for "bad step", or "misstep"), located south of Carmel-by-the-Sea, California. Eastwood had received U.S. Army basic training at nearby Fort Ord, where he remained as a lifeguard until discharged in 1953. On December 24, 1967, Eastwood bought five parcels totaling  of land along Malpaso Creek from Charles Sawyer. He later added more land until he owned . The land bordered the south bank of Malpaso Creek from the eastern side of Highway 1 to the coastal ridge. He sold it to Monterey County in 1995 for $3.08 million. Near the coast, a trail and later a road ran from Carmel to Big Sur during the 1800s.

Founding 

When Eastwood agreed to take the role of The Man with No Name in A Fistful of Dollars in 1964, his agent told him that it would be a "bad step" for his career. The Dollars Trilogy was surprisingly successful. After filming Where Eagles Dare in 1968, Eastwood grew irritated about the money he considered wasted during these big productions. He wanted more creative control over his films and decided to form his own production company. He thought the choice of "Malpaso" was appropriate.

Irving Leonard, Eastwood's financial adviser, organized the company for Eastwood following the success of and using the earnings from the Dollars Trilogy. The first feature they produced was the  1968 film Hang 'Em High. Leonard served as President of the Malpaso Company and associate producer of Eastwood's films from Hang 'Em High until his death in 1969.
 
Eastwood is known for very tight shooting schedules, finishing his films on schedule and on budget, or earlier and under budget, typically in much less time than most production companies.

Few film production companies such as Malpaso Productions have been involved with one studio for releasing its motion pictures. Warner Bros. Pictures has served as the distributor of many of Clint Eastwood's produced, directed and starred films, a relationship that has lasted for nearly half a century and resulted in more than 40 features.

Filmography

1960s

1970s

1980s

1990s

2000s

2010s

2020s

References

1967 establishments in California
American companies established in 1967
Clint Eastwood
Companies based in Burbank, California
Entertainment companies based in California
Entertainment companies established in 1967
Film production companies of the United States